Laura Trenter (born 29 May 1961 in Stockholm) is a Swedish author. She is the daughter of Stieg Trenter and Ulla Trenter. Aside from novels she has written guide books and picture books and has made computer games.

Trenter has been a journalist at Kvällsposten. She has been called the "Children's crime fiction queen" (Swedish: 'Barnens deckardrotttning'). In 2003 she received Gothenburg Book Fair's price as the best novel author.

Bibliography
1994 - Pojkarna Puckelbros bilbekymmer (together with Joakim Lindengren)
1995 - Parisresan (together with Katrin Ehlers)
1996 - Moster Jajjas katter (together with Joakim Lindengren)
1997 - Londonresan (together with Katrin Ehlers)
1997 - Mysteriet på Molly Mercedes (together with Joakim Lindengren)
1998 - Hjälp! Rånare!
1999 - Det brinner!
2000 - Äventyr på Gripsholms slott (together with Erika Kovanen)
2000 - Pappa polis
2001 - Gräv efter spår (together with Erika Kovanen)
2001 - Snögrottan
2001 - Den svarta portföljen (together with Magnus Bard)
2002 - Julian & Jim
2003 - Fotoalbumet (together with Katrin Ehlers)
2004 - Puman
2005 - Det lysande ögat (together with Tony Manieri)
2005 - Dagboken (together with Katrin Ehlers)
2006 - Stackelstrands hemlighet (together with Tony Marieri)
2007 - Testamentet (together with Katrin Ehlers)

References

External links

Laura Trenter's website (Swedish)

1961 births
Living people
Writers from Stockholm
Swedish crime fiction writers
Swedish children's writers
Swedish women children's writers
Women crime fiction writers